Cascade (formerly, Cascade City) is an unincorporated community in Plumas County, California. It lies at an elevation of 4055 feet (1236 m).

References

Unincorporated communities in California
Unincorporated communities in Plumas County, California